The Iglesia de La Matriz del Salvador (The Matriz Church of the Saviour) is a church in the city of Valparaíso, Chile. Located in the heart of the port district (Barrio Puerto) of the city, surrounded by cobblestone streets and houses it has a historical importance in the city and was declared a National Monument of Chile in 1971.

History

Origins
In 1559, the Bishop of Santiago, Rodrigo Marmolejo, founded the first temple in Valparaiso, a small chapel that was really little more than a hut. From this point as the settlement grew a series of successive religious congregations: Augustinian (1627), Franciscan (1664), Order of the Blessed Virgin Mary of Mercy (1715), Congregation of the Sacred Hearts of Jesus and Mary (1834) and Jesuits (1850) used the church. Wealthy local families  developed the town and church giving it the distinctive architectural style that it has today.

Destruction and reconstruction
In 1578, Sir Francis Drake was said to have devastated the port and looted the chapel, taking its treasures and a chalice of silver. During the 17th and 18th century the church suffered pirate attacks. The church has also had a very uncertain history given the frequency of earthquakes which have gutted the building. Since the initial foundation, three churches have been successively erected on the site of the first chapel.

In November 1822 an earthquake affected the church to the extent it had to be rebuilt stone by stone but this was not done quickly. The church remained a ruin for over a decade until reconstruction began in 1837, finished in 1842, under the direction of priest Jose Antonio Riobío.

This fourth construction, is the one that still stands today.

In 1868, a quite unusual situation took place in the church when it was used as a voting venue for the elections.

Architectural style
The church of a typical basilical style, but is built in a way to represent three ships in a rectangular fashion, separated by two waters. The main facade stands out with its classic composition. Eight columns surround the body of the church and the interior walls are decorated with zenithal paintings. There are two main influences which make up the interior of the church including this classicist style of the tower, and the 18th century Creole style represented by its great heavy walls of adobe brick and the ceiling covered with clay roofing tiles.

See also

References

Buildings and structures in Valparaíso
Buildings and structures in Valparaíso Region
Roman Catholic churches completed in 1842
Tourist attractions in Valparaíso Region
1842 establishments in Chile
19th-century Roman Catholic church buildings in Chile
Neoclassical church buildings in Chile